State Road 109 (NM 109), also known as Jarales Rd, is a state highway in the US state of New Mexico. NM 109's southern terminus is at NM 346 southeast of Bosque, and the northern terminus is at NM 309 near Belen.

Future
The at grade crossing with the BNSF railway is to be converted to a grade separated crossing. Construction is expected to begin in December 2021.

Major intersections

See also

References

109
Transportation in Valencia County, New Mexico